4 Hearts is a Portuguese film directed by Manuel Mozos, released in 2009 and produced by Rosa Filmes. The cast features Rita Martins, Filipe Duarte, João Lagarto, Margarida Marinho and Diana Costa e Silva.

Plot 
As a teenager, Diana is looking for true love and uses her father and her stepmother as an ideal example. That is, until she finds that her stepmother is having an affair. While trying to separate her stepmother from her lover, Diana learns more than she bargained for about herself.

References

External links

Films directed by Manuel Mozos
Portuguese romantic drama films
2000s Portuguese-language films
2008 films